KDEA-LP (99.1 FM) is a low-power FM radio station licensed to Delta, Colorado, United States. The station is currently owned by State of Colorado Telecom Services.

References

External links
 

DEA-LP
DEA-LP
Radio stations established in 2003
2003 establishments in Colorado